= Mama Lulu =

Filipino-American TikTok personality

Mama LuLu
- Born: Lulu Balgos; August 3, 1957 (age 69); Makati, Philippines
- Citizenship: Filipino-American
- Occupations: Social media personality; Content creator
- Known for: Family content on TikTok (otakoyakisoba)
- Children: 5

Lulu Balgos (born August 3, 1957), known online as Mama LuLu or Mama lulu, is a Filipino-American social media personality and content creator. She is the head of the family account otakoyakisoba, famous for funny, sarcastic and sweet family videos and her son Oliver.

== Early life and career ==
Balgos was born on August 3, 1957, in Makati, Philippines. She later moved to the United States. She worked to supplement family income when her husband fell ill requiring a need for dialysis, she took positions in retail and later served as a nursing assistant and hospice nurse. She has described the experience as both challenging and rewarding.

She is the mother of five children and her husband later died. She has stated that she did not remarry.

== Social media ==
Mama LuLu's social media sensation shot to fame on the family TikTok account, otakoyakisoba, which she manages with her son, Oliver. The account entertain followers with comedic skits, family interactions, foodie vlogs of traditional Filipino food, and real-life content about their experiences in the state. The family describes itself as "Your favorite family of Eedjiots." The account has attracted millions of followers.

In October 2025, she travelled back home to the Philippines for the first time since 2007, recording the special journey with her loved ones. The visit included stops in Manila, Tagaytay and Manaoag Church.

She also expressed fandom for the group BTS and attended one of their concerts.

== Personal life ==
Balgos lives in the United States with family members. She has five children and grandchildren. In interviews and videos she happy discusses family, loyalty, and her late husband.
